Tallaght is a stop on the Luas light-rail tram system in Dublin, Ireland.  It opened in 2004 as the terminus of the Red Line.  The stop is located on a section of reserved track at the side of the road the populous suburb of Tallaght, opposite The Square Shopping Centre.  It also provides access to Tallaght Stadium, the offices of South Dublin County Council, and the local campus of the Technological University Dublin.  The stop has two edge platforms, and trams reverse using a double crossover immediately beyond the stop.  Thus, one platform is used for arrivals and one for departures.  Upon leaving Tallaght, trams travel along their own right of way, rounding a corner where the tracks are straddled by buildings.  They then head north on their way to Connolly or The Point.

The stop is also served by Dublin Bus routes 27, 49, 54A, 56A, 65, 65B, 75, 75a, 76, 76A, 76B, 77A, 175 and 210.

References

Luas Red Line stops in South Dublin (county)